Balkan Spy is a 1984 Yugoslav comedy drama film directed by Serbian directors Dušan Kovačević and Božidar Nikolić.

Plot
Ilija Čvorović (Bata Stojković), a former Stalinist who spent several years in a prison on Goli otok, is contacted by the police to routinely answer questions about his sub-tenant, Petar Markov Jakovljević (Bora Todorović), a businessman, who spent twenty years living in Paris, and now has returned to Belgrade to open a tailor shop. After only several minutes, Ilija is free to go, however, he starts to suspect that his sub-tenant, Petar, might be a spy. As time passes, Ilija becomes convinced that Petar, a modern man from a capitalist country, represents a great threat to national security and the socialist system, and begins spying on Petar. Ilija's wife Danica (Mira Banjac) is more concerned with the future of their daughter Sonja (Sonja Savić), who, although holding a degree in dentistry, is unable to find a job. After a bout of spying, Ilija phones inspector Dražić (Milan Štrljić), claiming that Petar was meeting with "suspicious people" (actually Petar's intellectual friends), but Dražić does not take him seriously. Ilija decides to take matters into his own hands. He begins his own surveillance operation against the innocent man and his friends. Eventually, he bars his house, buys a guard dog, arms himself with munition, and even gets help from his brother Đura (Zvonko Lepetić), both of them becoming convinced that Petar is a foreign agent.

One evening, Ilija is accidentally hit by a car, which he sees as an attempt of assassination. Soon, even Danica starts to believe Ilija, but Sonja believes that her father is suffering from paranoia. Đuro manages to capture several of Petar's friends, holding them in his basement, beating them up and making them "reveal their terrorist plans". Petar comes to Ilija's house, where he finds Danica. Petar says that he wanted to say goodbye, as he is traveling to New York, and asks Danica why Ilija and his brother are following him, thus revealing that he was aware of their "surveillance operation". Ilija and Đura crash into the house, sending Danica away, tying Petar to a chair, beating him and forcing him to "confess". Petar keeps claiming that he is not a spy, but the brothers do not believe him. Đura leaves the house for a while, to bring one of Petar's friends who "admitted everything", and Ilija continues to interrogate Petar. However, Ilija gets too excited and has a heart attack. Petar manages to get to the phone and call the ambulance, and then, still handcuffed to the chair, he leaves the house to try to catch his plane. Ilija, while in severe pain, phones Đura's house and tells his wife to tell him to "block the airport". He then crawls out of the house, and starts crawling after Petar, with his dog following him.

Cast
Bata Stojković as Ilija Čvorović
Bora Todorović as Petar Markov Jakovljević
Mira Banjac as Danica Čvorović
Sonja Savić as Sonja Čvorović
Zvonko Lepetić as Đura Čvorović
Bata Živojinović as the pancake seller
Predrag Laković as the professor
Branka Petrić as the journalist
Milivoje Tomić as the doctor
Milan Štrljić as inspector Dražić
Milan Mihailović as the painter
Vladan Živković

Awards
Balkanski špijun won two awards in 1984 at the Pula Film Festival, the Golden Arena Award and the Best Actor Award, which went to Danilo "Bata" Stojković for his portrayal of Ilija Čvorović.

See also
List of Yugoslav films

References

External links

 

1984 films
1980s Serbian-language films
Films set in Belgrade
Films set in Serbia
Films set in Yugoslavia
Serbian comedy-drama films
Serbian black comedy films
Yugoslav black comedy films
1980s black comedy films
1984 comedy-drama films
Yugoslav films based on plays
Films based on works by Dušan Kovačević
Films with screenplays by Dušan Kovačević
1980s spy comedy-drama films
Yugoslav comedy-drama films
Films shot in Belgrade